Microhelia angelica is a species of moth of the family Noctuidae. It is found from California to Washington.

The wingspan is 9–13 mm.

External links
 Images
 Bug Guide

Heliothinae